Sean Walsh may refer to:

 Seán Walsh (politician) (1925–1989), Irish Fianna Fáil politician
 Seán Walsh (footballer) (born 1957), Irish Gaelic footballer
 Sean Walsh (born 1991), member of The Original Rudeboys

See also
 Seann Walsh (born 1985), English comedian and actor
 Séanna Walsh (born 1957), Irish politician and former IRA militant